Sid Elliott was an Australian professional rugby league footballer who played in the 1930s and 1940s.  Elliott played for Western Suburbs and  Canterbury-Bankstown.  Elliott was a foundation player for Canterbury-Bankstown.

Playing career
Elliott made his first grade debut in Round 9 1933 against Balmain at Drummoyne Oval.  In 1934, Elliott was selected to play for NSW Country and featured in 2 games scoring 2 tries.  In 1935, Elliott signed for newly admitted side Canterbury-Bankstown.

Elliott played for the club in their first ever game against North Sydney at North Sydney Oval which finished in a 20-5 loss.  

Canterbury-Bankstown finished the 1935 season in second last position narrowly avoiding the wooden spoon which was handed to University.  Elliott played sporadically for Canterbury over the next 5 seasons mainly featuring in reserve grade and he retired at the end of 1940.

References

Australian rugby league players
Canterbury-Bankstown Bulldogs players
Western Suburbs Magpies players
Country New South Wales Origin rugby league team players
Rugby league players from Sydney
Rugby league fullbacks
Rugby league centres
Year of birth missing
Place of birth missing
Year of death missing
Place of death missing